Orange County Soccer Club is an American soccer team based in the Orange County, California city of Irvine. Founded in 2010 as the Los Angeles Blues, the team currently plays in the second tier USL Championship.

The team plays its home games at Championship Soccer Stadium, located inside Great Park in Irvine.

History
The then Los Angeles Blues were founded by Iranian-American businessman Ali Mansouri in 1998 and announced as a USL Pro expansion franchise on December 7, 2010. The team was associated with the United Soccer Leagues W-League team LA Blues, and is part of the larger Orange County Blues organization, which has competed in Los Angeles-area amateur leagues since 1998. They introduced their first three players—goalkeeper Oscar Dautt and midfielders Cesar Rivera and Josh Tudela—at a formal launch event on December 14, 2010.

After an extensive pre-season, the Blues played their first games in the Caribbean over the weekend of April 15–17, 2011, a 3–0 victory over Sevilla Puerto Rico, and a 2–1 victory over Antigua Barracuda. The first goal in franchise history was scored by Cesar Rivera.

In January 2012, the Blues announced the hiring of Steve Donner (formerly CEO of Orlando City) as vice president of business operations to focus on improving marketing for the club and to bring professionalism to the front-office. The first game of the 2012 season reflected these efforts with a 2,432 attendance compared to 696 for the first home game in 2011 (the Blues averaged 382 during the 2011 season).

In 2016, the team was purchased by American businessman James Keston, rebranded to Orange County SC. Prior to the 2017 season, Orange County became the USL affiliate of Los Angeles FC in a multi-year deal, which was ended after 2018. The team won the Western Conference Regular Season Title in 2018 with 20 Wins, 8 losses and 6 ties. They defeated Saint Louis FC and Reno 1868 FC before losing 2–1 to Phoenix Rising FC in the Western Conference Final. Thomas Enevoldsen scored 20 goals and was named to the All-League First Team along with Aodhan Quinn.

In the 2021 season, Head Coach Braden Cloutier was dismissed mid-season and replaced by Assistant Coach Richard Chaplow.  OCSC went on to finish second in the Pacific Division, and advance to the USL Championship Final defeating Tampa Bay Rowdies at home, 3–1 in regulation.

Stadium
 Titan Stadium; Fullerton, California (2011–2013)
 Anteater Stadium; Irvine, California (2014–2016)
 Championship Soccer Stadium; Irvine, California (2017–present)

Club culture

Rivalries
Orange County competes in the 405 Derby against rivals LA Galaxy II. The clubs are, as of late 2022, in a dispute over who will play at Championship Soccer Stadium, Orange County SC's current home stadium, after leaked documents showed the Galaxy organization is attempting to seize full-time usage of the venue.

Players and staff

Current roster

Front office
  James Keston – Owner & CEO
  Oliver Wyss – President of Soccer Operations & General Manager
  Peter Nugent – Sports Director
  Dan Rutstein - Interim President of Business Operations

Technical staff
  Richard Chaplow – Head Coach
  Robert Earnshaw – Assistant Coach
  Paul Hardyman – Assistant Coach
  Didier Crettenand – Assistant Coach
  Victor Nogueira – Goalkeeping Coach
  Mitch Deyhle – Director of Sports Medicine & Head Athletic Trainer

Head coaches
  Charlie Naimo (2011–2012)
  Jesus Rico-Sanz (2012–2013)
  Dariush Yazdani (2013–2014)
  Oliver Wyss (2014–2016)
  Barry Venison (2016)
  Logan Pause (2017)
  Braeden Cloutier (2018–2021)
  Richard Chaplow (2021–present)

Record

Year-by-year

This is a partial list of the last five seasons completed by the club. For the full season-by-season history, see List of Orange County SC seasons.

1. Avg. attendance include statistics from league matches only.
2. Top goalscorer(s) includes all goals scored in league play, playoffs, U.S. Open Cup, and other competitive matches.

Honors
USL Championship
 Winners: 2021
USL Championship Western Conference (playoffs)
 Winners: 2021
USL Championship Western Conference (regular season)
 Winners (2): 2015, 2018

References

External links

 

 
Association football clubs established in 2010
USL Championship teams
Soccer clubs in Greater Los Angeles
Iranian soccer clubs in the United States
2010 establishments in California
Soccer clubs in California